1922 in radio details the internationally significant events in radio broadcasting for the year 1922.


Events
6 February – Official inauguration of Radio Tour Eiffel from the Eiffel Tower in Paris, transmitting meteorological bulletins.
8 February – President of the United States, Warren G. Harding introduces the first radio in the White House.
14 February – The world's first regular wireless broadcasts for entertainment, made by Peter Eckersley, begin transmission on radio station 2MT from a hut at the Marconi Company laboratories at Writtle near Chelmsford in England. Initially they are for half an hour on Tuesday evenings.
19 February – Ed Wynn becomes the first big vaudeville star to join radio. The first broadcast is Wynn's The Perfect Fool and the station is WJZ, New York. This is also the first time in the world that a radio show is broadcast before a studio audience.
27 February – The first National Radio Conference, led by Herbert Hoover, is held in Washington, D.C.
10 March – In the United States, Variety magazine prints as its front-page headline "Radio Sweeping Country - 1,000,000 Sets in Use".
19 March – Broadcasting from the Shukhov Tower in Moscow begins with a concert of Russian music.
11 May – Station 2LO becomes the second radio station to broadcast regularly in the United Kingdom, operating from Marconi House in London, initially for one hour a day. The first radio sports commentary in Britain is made on the station when Arthur Burrows describes a boxing match between Ted "Kid" Lewis and Georges Carpentier at Olympia. No further sports broadcasts are made in the country until 1927 due to pressure from newspapers.
18 May – Warren G. Harding becomes the first United States president heard live on radio, when his speech to the United States Chamber of Commerce in Washington, D.C. is carried by Navy broadcasting station NOF.
28 May – The Detroit News Orchestra, the world's first radio orchestra (a symphonic ensemble organized specifically to play on radio), begins broadcasting from radio station WWJ in Detroit, Michigan.
June – KZKZ is initiated on radio station
21 July – A limited commercial license is issued for operating radio station WIAE, in Vinton, Iowa, to station manager Marie Zimmerman, making WIAE the first radio station owned and operated by a woman.
22 August – The first national wireless exhibition is held at the Champ de Mars in Paris.
7 September – On the occasion of the centennial celebrations of Brazilian independence, President Epitácio Pessoa of Brazil makes the country's first radio broadcast.
17 September – First radio broadcasts in Russia.
2 October – CKAC, the first French language radio station in North America, launches in Montreal, Quebec.
7 October – Speaking on radio station 2LO, the Prince of Wales becomes the first member of the British royal family to make a public broadcast.
6 November – The privately owned French radio station Radiola begins regular transmissions.
14 November – London station 2LO transfers to the British Broadcasting Company and transmits its first two news bulletins, each read twice ("once quickly and once slowly" – to determine listener reaction).
15 November – The British Broadcasting Company opens its stations in Birmingham (5IT) and Manchester (2ZY).
4 December – A broadcasting "music ensemble" is formed in Pittsburgh by that city's KDKA; it will be known as the KDKA Orchestra.
Walter Camp's "Daily Dozen" exercise regimen is first broadcast in the United States.

Debuts
9 January – KQV is licensed and on the air in Pittsburgh, the city becomes the first with both a commercial station (KDKA in 1920) and two commercial radio stations.
20 February – WGY is launched by General Electric at Schenectady, New York, USA, after having established several experimental stations there since 1912.
2 March – WEAF (later WNBC) is launched by the American Telephone & Telegraph company in New York City, New York.
13 March – WRR (later KTCK) in Dallas launched after many short tests.
25 March – KGW is launched by The Oregonian newspaper in Portland, Oregon, as that city's first commercial radio station
31 March – WWL begins broadcasting as a 10-watt station. The first program on the air was a piano recital.
10 April – WBT in Charlotte, North Carolina, goes commercial from its former experimental authorization as 4XD (19 December 1920 sign-on) as North Carolina's first commercial radio station.
13 April – WGU, Chicago, Illinois, has its formal opening. The station became WMAQ 3 October 1922.
27 April – WOE is launched by the Buckeye Radio Service Co. in Akron, Ohio.
2 May – DFW's WBAP began broadcasting on the air at a wavelength of 360 meters which later changed to 400 meters later that August. 
6 May – KZN (changed to KSL in 1925) began its first broadcast in Salt Lake City, Utah with a message by Heber J. Grant, President of the Church of Jesus Christ of Latter-day Saints.
11 May – KGU in Honolulu, Hawaii, goes on the air as Hawaii's first radio station.
15 May – WDAE in St. Petersburg, Tampa goes on air
5 June – WEAN (later WPRV) goes on the air in Providence, Rhode Island.
8 June – WFBR begins broadcasting in Baltimore, Maryland.
11 July – WHAM, Rochester, New York, begins broadcasting.
6 September – WJAR (later WHJJ) begins broadcasting in Providence.
3 December – WKAQ (AM) goes on the air as Puerto Rico's first radio station.
Undated: WAAB begins broadcasting.

Births
6 February – Denis Norden, English comedy scriptwriter and broadcast personality (died 2018)
23 April – Jack May, English actor (died 1997)
29 May – Mae Brussell, American radio personality and conspiracy theorist (died 1988)
10 June – Bill Kerr, South African-born Australian actor (died 2014)
17 July – Sid Collins, American motor-racing broadcaster (died 1977)
16 August – James Casey, English variety artist and radio comedy scriptwriter and producer (died 2011)
20 September – Dottie Ray, American radio host (died 2016)
5 October – Janie Joplin, American radio announcer and voice-over artist (died 2007)

See also 
List of oldest radio stations

References

Sources

External links
Marie Zimmerman-- Broadcasting's first female owner

 
Radio by year